Agra is a 2007 Indian Tamil-language romantic drama film directed by Chithiraiselvan, starring Vikas and Emi Mohan. It was released on 8 November 2007.

Plot

Cast 
Vikas as Kannan
Emi Mohan as Pooja Thakur
Nassar as the older Kannan
Anjali as Neema
Ennur Murali
Gayathri
Archana
V. M. Ravi Raj
K. C. Ravithevan
Abhinayashree
Y. Gee. Mahendra in a guest appearance

Production 
The film marked the acting debut of Vikas, the son of dance choreographer John Babu. In mid-2007, the crew of the film undertook a promotional campaign to ask the public to vote for the Agra-centred Taj Mahal in the New 7 Wonders of the World campaign organised by New 7 Wonders Foundation.

In 2013, six years after the film's release, the film's director and producer P. Chithiraiselvan was arrested for failing to pay back loans on sums taken out for the production of Agra and Thalaivan (2014).

Reception 
The film was released on 8 November 2007, coinciding with the festival of Diwali. In the review by Sify.com, the critic noted "Agra, is a simple straightforward love story, packaged with enough steamy scenes to attract the audiences and carrying an "A" certificate with cuts from the censors", adding "the film's main attraction is the steamy scenes in the first half and a sizzling provocative item number from Abhinayashree post-interval". Malini Mannath of ChennaiOnline.com wrote "The debutant director has chosen some eye-catching locations as the backdrop for his scenes. But the script is weakly etched". The reviewer added "The most irrelevant part of the script, these seem to be a desperate attempt by a debutant director to hard-sell a love-caper with the help of some sleaze." A reviewer from Webdunia also gave the film a negative review, calling out the film's adult theme.

References

External links 

2000s Tamil-language films
2007 films
2007 romantic drama films
Indian romantic drama films